Joan Porqueras i Fàbregas (Barcelona, 1893 - London, 1966) was a Catalan economist and politician.

Biography
In 1893, Joan Porqueras i Fàbregas was born in the Sant Martí de Provençals neighborhood of Barcelona. The son of a bartender, he studied bookkeeping. In 1909, he took part in the events of Tragic Week, was wounded and fled to Argentina. After a few years he returned to Barcelona and worked in various occupations. He took part in the 1931 local elections as a candidate for Esquerra Republicana de Catalunya (ERC), at the same time as he was a member of the CNT's Liberal Professions Union. As a member of the Ateneu Enciclopèdic Popular, he founded the Institut de Ciències Econòmics de Catalunya, where he taught three economics courses.

In August 1936 he was elected as a member of the CNT to the Economic Council of Catalunya, from where he signed the Collectivisation Decree and drafted the civil mobilization project. He acted as the Minister of Economy of the Generalitat de Catalunya from 26 September to 17 December 1936. In 1937 he went into exile in France, and at the outbreak of World War II he went to London, where he collaborated with the BBC.

Works
 Irlanda i Catalunya. Paral·lelisme polític-econòmic (1932)
  Les possibilitats econòmiques d'una Catalunya independent (1932)
 Assaig d'Economia Política (1932–34)
 Els factors econòmics de la revolució (1937)
 Vuitanta dies al govern de la Generalitat (1937)
 Les finances de la revolució (1937)

References

1893 births
1966 deaths
Economy ministers of Catalonia
Anarchists from Catalonia
People from Barcelona
Spanish emigrants to France
French emigrants to the United Kingdom